Aung Myo Hlaing (also known as Aung Aung (အောင်အောင်)) is a Burmese chess International Master. He is a two-time Myanmar National Chess Championship winner, finishing first in 1997 and 2008.

References

Living people
1968 births
Chess International Masters
Burmese chess players
20th-century Burmese people
21st-century Burmese people